State Theater was a historic theater located at Newark in New Castle County, Delaware. It was built about 1929 and was a Neoclassical style, rectangular brick structure with one of the narrow ends oriented toward the street. The theater occupied most of the building, with two small store spaces located at either end of the facade.  It was closed near the end of the 1980s, and it was demolished in 1989.

It was added to the National Register of Historic Places in 1983.

References

Theatres on the National Register of Historic Places in Delaware
Theatres in Delaware
Neoclassical architecture in Delaware
Theatres completed in 1929
Buildings and structures in Newark, Delaware
National Register of Historic Places in New Castle County, Delaware
Demolished buildings and structures in Delaware
Demolished theatres in the United States
Buildings and structures demolished in 1989